Tränenherz (Teardrop heart) is the seventh studio album from German electronic band Blutengel. It was released as a single CD, 2x CD double album and limited edition double album with bonus disc. The bonus disc to the limited edition is an instrumental album called Signs of the Zodiac.To promote the album, two singles were released with accompanying music videos for Reich Mir Die Hand and Über Den Horizont.

Track listing

References

External links
Blutengel: album reviews and ratings
Discogs

2011 albums
Blutengel albums